Fairfield Rice Mill Chimney  is a historic rice mill chimney located near Georgetown, Georgetown County, South Carolina. It is one of seven known extant rice mill chimneys in Georgetown County.  It was associated with Fairfield, one of several productive plantations on the Waccamaw River. The chimney is octagonal shaped and approximately 35 feet high. In the 1930s the Fairfield rice mill, with its steam engine, boiler, and other machinery, was taken to Dearborn, Michigan, reassembled, refurbished, and put back into operation as a museum exhibit in Henry Ford’s Greenfield Village.

It was listed on the National Register of Historic Places in 1988.

References

External links
Chimney Pressure Testing

Agricultural buildings and structures on the National Register of Historic Places in South Carolina
National Register of Historic Places in Georgetown County, South Carolina
Buildings and structures in Georgetown County, South Carolina
Chimneys in the United States